Aspergillus spinosus is a species of fungus in the genus Aspergillus. Aspergillus spinosus produces aszonalenins, 2-pyrovoylaminobenzamide, fumigachlorin and pseurotins.

Growth and morphology

A. spinosus has been cultivated on both Czapek yeast extract agar (CYA) plates and Malt Extract Agar Oxoid® (MEAOX) plates. The growth morphology of the colonies can be seen in the pictures below.

References

Further reading 
 

 

spinosus
Fungi described in 1989